Pavel Mintyukov (born November 25, 2003) is a Russian junior ice hockey defenseman currently playing for the Ottawa 67's of the Ontario Hockey League (OHL) as a prospect to the Anaheim Ducks of the National Hockey League (NHL). He was drafted 10th overall by the Ducks in the 2022 NHL Entry Draft.

Playing career
As a youth, Mintyukov played in his native Russia, featuring within the junior ranks of HC Dynamo Moscow. Following a single season in the MHL with MHC Dynamo Moscow, Mintyukov was drafted in the 2020 CHL Import Draft, 52nd overall by the Saginaw Spirit of the Ontario Hockey League (OHL). 

Following his ambition for a professional career in North America, Mintyukov was signed to a contract with the Saginaw Spirit on 7 July 2020. 

With the 2020–21 season cancelled due to the COVID-19 pandemic shutdown, Mintyukov returned for the following 2021–22 season, and impressed in showing his offensive acumen from the blueline in posting 17 goals and 45 assist for 62 points in 67 regular season games. Named to the OHL Third All-Star Team, Mintyukov was then selected by the Anaheim Ducks in the first-round, 10th overall, of the 2022 NHL Entry Draft.

He was soon signed to a three-year, entry-level contract with the Ducks on 16 July 2022. Returning to the junior ranks to continue his development, Mintyukov began the 2022–23 season with the Spirit, notching 16 goals and 54 points in just 37 regular season games before he was traded to contending OHL club, the Ottawa 67's, in exchange for a staggering 9 draft picks on 10 January 2023.

Career statistics

Regular season and playoffs

International

Awards and honours

References

External links

2003 births
Living people
Anaheim Ducks draft picks
National Hockey League first-round draft picks
Ottawa 67's players
Russian ice hockey defencemen
Saginaw Spirit players